The 1966 Live Recordings is a 36-CD boxset of live recordings from the 1966 Live Tour by Bob Dylan, released on Legacy Records in November 2016. It includes every known recording from the tour, including audience tapes. Most of the set was unreleased at that point and some tapes never circulated before.

Background
The 1966 Live Recordings was released as a way to prevent the recordings from legally entering the public domain in Europe, in a similar fashion to The 50th Anniversary Collection (1962), The 50th Anniversary Collection 1963, and The 50th Anniversary Collection 1964. Studio sessions from 1965 and 1966 were released as part of The Bootleg Series Vol. 12 (with the live recordings from 1965 offered as digital download for the purchasers of the Collector's Edition).

Promotion
The set was announced on September 27, 2016, the track "Tell Me, Momma" was uploaded the next day on YouTube for promotion, and the release was supported by a 12-minute documentary. 'The Untold Story Behind The Recordings' finally gave full recognition to the pioneering work of Richard Alderson, who recorded the European concerts; most of the concert filming was, moreover, done by Howard Alk, with only a few concerts partially filmed by D. A. Pennebaker.

Other releases
The concert from Manchester (Discs 19 and 20) was previously released in 1998 as part of The Bootleg Series Vol. 4. A concert from the boxset (London, 26 May 1966 - Discs 28 and 29) was released separately in November 2016 under the title The Real Royal Albert Hall 1966 Concert. Additionally, the 13 April 1966 show in Sydney (discs 1 and 2) was released as an Australia-only limited edition double LP under the title Live in Sydney 1966.

Reception

The 1966 Live Recordings currently maintains a 93% positive ("Universal acclaim") rating at Metacritic. Jesse Jarnow from Pitchfork said, "A classic tour from start to finish, the set’s only drawbacks owe more to the format than the music", praising the great performances but insisting on the repetition of the same setlist, though noting that the repetitive setlists could be seen as a "feature, not a bug."

Track listing
All songs written by Bob Dylan except "Baby, Let Me Follow You Down".

All tracks in mono except CBS Records recordings (Discs 17, 19, 20, 28, 29, 30 and 31) which are in stereo.

Musicians
 Bob Dylan: acoustic guitar, electric guitar, harmonica, piano, lead vocal
 Robbie Robertson: electric guitar
 Rick Danko: bass, background vocal
 Garth Hudson: organ
 Richard Manuel: piano
 Mickey Jones: drums
 Sandy Konikoff: drums (before March 26, 1966)

Musicians per Olof Bjorner.

See also
 Bob Dylan World Tour 1966

References

2016 live albums
Bob Dylan live albums
Columbia Records live albums